Pentti Johannes Lehto (February 15, 1924 – April 20, 2007) was a Finnish illustrator, caricaturist, cartoonist and author of children's books. He lived in Tampere and drew cartoons for newspapers and magazines such as Aamulehti and Apu. His pseudonym as a cartoonist was Penalehto.

Works 
 Salaperäiset kirjaimet. Karisto 1952
 Herjat & narrit. WSOY 1979

References 
 Suomen kuvittajat Aarne Nopsasesta Alvar Aaltoon, Martta Wendelinistä Urpo Huhtaseen 17.10.2006 : Pentti Lehto finnish

Finnish cartoonists
Finnish caricaturists
Finnish illustrators
Finnish children's writers
Finnish children's book illustrators
Writers who illustrated their own writing
1924 births
2007 deaths